Danin or Danina may refer to the following people

Danina Jeftić (born 1986), Serbian actress and former handball player
Assur-danin-pal (8th century BC), son of the king of Assyria, Shalmaneser III
Ainina and Danina, pre-Christian female deities worshipped in ancient Iberia
Eliran Danin (born 1984), Israeli footballer
Ezra Danin (1903–1984), Israeli intelligence officer and politician 
Danin Adrovic - Montenegro Musician,Artist and Compositor.